Jim Widmayer (born August 23, 1969) is an American professional darts player who plays in British Darts Organisation (BDO) events.

Career

Widmayer played in the inaugural World Matchplay in 1994, losing 6–8 in the first round to Keith Deller.

Prior to the 2011 Winmau World Masters, Widmayer damaged his arm whilst clearing fallen trees in the wake of Hurricane Irene. His injuries were not serious, and he went on to reach the televised stages of the tournament. In the last 24, he lost 2–3 in sets to Rick Hofstra after missing seven match darts.

Widmayer qualified for the 2014 World Championship and entered in the preliminary stage, where he upset Garry Thompson 3–2 in sets. He played world number one Stephen Bunting in the first round and lost by 3 sets to 1.

In the 2015 World Championship, Widmayer again entered in the preliminary stage, where he fought back to beat Rhys Hayden 3–2 in sets after being 2–0 down. His reward was a tie in the first round against Rick Hofstra, who he lost to in the last 24 of the World Masters in 2011. He gained his revenge with a 3–1 victory, setting himself up with a tie against Martin Adams in the second round, which he lost 4–0.

World Championship results

BDO/WDF
 2014: First round (lost to Stephen Bunting 1–3) (sets)
 2015: Second round (lost to Martin Adams 0–4)
 2019: Preliminary round (lost to Nigel Heydon 2–3)
 2023:

References

External links

Official website

1969 births
American darts players
Living people
Professional Darts Corporation associate players
British Darts Organisation players